Gnorimoschema soffneri is a moth in the family Gelechiidae. It was described by Riedl in 1965. It is found on Corsica, Sicily and Crete, as well as in Spain, Italy, Bulgaria, Hungary, Turkey, Iraq, Iran and Afghanistan.

Subspecies
Gnorimoschema soffneri soffneri
Gnorimoschema soffneri montanum Povolný, 1967 (Iran, Afghanistan)

References

Gnorimoschema
Moths described in 1965